The Battle of Almenara was fought between the Agermanados (northern front) and the troops of Viceroy Diego Hurtado de Mendoza, on 18 July 1521, at Almenara (La Plana).

The Battle of Almenara was the second consecutive defeat for the Agermanados on the northern front, commanded by Jaume Ros.  The Viceroyal troops were commanded by the Duke of Sogorb, Alfons d'Aragó, and also included the troops of the Count of Almenara, Gaspar de Pròixita i Vives Boil.  Over 2,000 men died in the course of the battle.

The royalist forces retreated to Almenara, making it an army parade grounds and base of operations for La Plana and Onda.

Revolt of the Brotherhoods
1521 in Spain